Rekhta was the Hindustani language as its dialectal basis shifted to the Delhi dialect. This style evolved in both the Perso-Arabic and Devanagari scripts and is considered an early form of Urdu and Hindi.

The 13th century Sufi Muslim poet Amir Khusraw used the term "Hindavi" (meaning "of Hind or India") for the 'Rekhta' dialect (the ancestor of Modern Urdu), the Persianized offshoot of the Apabharamsa vernacular Old Hindi, towards its emergence during the era of Delhi Sultanate,  and gave shape to it in a handful Islamic literature, thus called "the father of Urdu literature". Other early Sufi poets includes Baba Farid. later from the 18th century, the dialect was became the literary language and was further developed by the poets Mir and Ghalib in the late Mughal period, and the term eventually fallen out and came to be known as "Urdu", by the end of the century.

Origin and usage
Rekhtā (from Persian verb  ) means "scattered" but also "mixed". The name was given to an early form of courtly literature in Delhi, where poems were made by combining Persian and early Hindustani (referred to as Hindavi or Dehlavi). Sometimes this was done by writing some lines of the poem in Persian, and others in Hindavi. Alternatively, both Persian and Hindavi could feature in a single line.

As Hindavi began to evolve into a literary language in the 18th century, the term Rekhta carried over to describe this new form. It denoted the Persianised, "high" form of Hindavi used in poetry, as opposed to the speech of the common population. The word was used alongside names like Urdu and Hindi. Its usage in this sense lasted into the 19th century, as evidenced by a sher of Mirza Ghalib:

      

By the end of the 19th century however, the term Rekhta had largely fallen out of use, and terms like Hindi, Urdu, and Hindustani were favoured.

Rekhti

The grammatically feminine counterpart of Rekhta is Rekhti, a term first popularised by the eighteenth-century poet Sa'adat Yar Khan 'Rangin' to designate verses written from the perspective of women. The Lucknow poet Insha Allah Khan was another well-known poet who composed rekhtis, according to Urdu scholar C M Naim.

See also
Dobhashi
Hindustani language
Persian and Urdu
Urdu poetry

References

Dialects of Urdu
Hindustani language